Dregus glebalis is a species of beetle in the family Carabidae, the only species in the genus Dregus.

References

Harpalinae